This is a list of members of the seventh Australian Capital Territory Legislative Assembly, as elected at and subsequent to 18 October 2008 election.

See also
2008 Australian Capital Territory general election

Notes 
 On 16 May 2011, Labor member for Ginninderra and former Chief Minister, Jon Stanhope, resigned. Chris Bourke was elected by countback on 1 June 2011 to fill the casual vacancy.

References

Members of Australian Capital Territory parliaments by term
21st-century Australian politicians